Megargel is a census-designated place and unincorporated community in Monroe County, Alabama, United States. Its population was 60 as of the 2020 census.

Demographics

History
This rural area was a center of cotton production into the early 20th century. 

The community was named for Roy Megargel, who was the owner of the Gulf, Florida, and Alabama Railroad (GFA) in the early part of the 20th century. He initially got the town of Jones Mill (known today as Frisco City) to agree to change their name to Roy in 1913 on the condition he construct a rail line to the town. When he failed to do so, the town reverted to its old name in 1919.

Climate
Climate is characterized by relatively high temperatures and evenly distributed precipitation throughout the year.  The Köppen Climate Classification sub-type for this climate is "Cfa" (Humid Subtropical Climate).
<div style="width:75%;">

References

Census-designated places in Monroe County, Alabama
Census-designated places in Alabama
Unincorporated communities in Monroe County, Alabama
Unincorporated communities in Alabama